Saint-Charles is a settlement in Kent County, New Brunswick, Canada.  It is home of many famous people such as Christian Kit Goguen and the band Réveil. There are some landmarks that are well known in the province like the community center, the "Épicerie Saint-Charles" store, and the castle from "Chateau Spring Water".

The mayor of the metropolis is Emile Chevarie.

History

Notable people

See also
List of communities in New Brunswick

References

Settlements in New Brunswick
Communities in Kent County, New Brunswick